The Sustainable Business Network (SBN) is a membership-based social enterprise located in Auckland, New Zealand. The network was created in October 2002 by founder and CEO Rachel Brown.

History
The network was founded by Rachel Brown in 2002. Rachel continues to serve as CEO. It is a forum for businesses, government groups and organizations throughout New Zealand who are interested in sustainable business practices and sustainable development. The ultimate goal of the SBN is to make New Zealand a model sustainable nation. It has 500 member companies.

Members are offered networking, educational and organizational opportunities in order for them to reach their sustainability goals. SBN helps its members collaborate and learn; profile stories and connect; and access practical support.

Campaign for sustainable KiwiSaver options
In January 2015, CEO Rachel Brown said there was strong demand for an ethical and sustainable KiwiSaver provider, which was not being met by the current market: "There's a mismatch between their criteria and the options that are being presented through ethical funds at the moment." A survey the SBN had conducted of 1,400 people in June 2014 indicated that 90 percent of people wanted a sustainable Kiwisaver option, while 97 percent would actually move to one if the rate of return were the same as conventional schemes. Brown said she was in talks with a number of banks interested in setting up green KiwiSaver funds, which she hoped would launch in 2016.

Online green business course
In January 2015, it was announced that the New Zealand Marketing Association, the SBN, and GoodSense Learning were to launch an online professional course in green marketing called "Sustainable Marketing Online".

Organisation

Transformation areas
SBN focuses its activity around four transformation areas it sees as critical for New Zealand:
Renewables: enabling the use of renewable energy
Community: building thriving communities
Mega efficiency: maximising the use of all resources
Restorative: enhancing New Zealand’s natural capital

All of the SBS's projects and activities are aligned with one or more of these transformation areas.

Membership
Members are given access to resources and knowledge that facilitate them to become a more sustainable business. A membership fee is paid to the SBN based on the organisation's turnover. Once a member, the company is introduced into the network of other SBN members where they can share each other's knowledge and come to events to hear other members speak. Members are profiled on the SBN membership directory, receive discounts on national events, and are invited to participate in the NZI National Sustainable Business Network Awards as business transformation projects.

Members also have access to SBN tools such as the Get Sust Online assessment tool which allows companies to track progress, see where they could improve, how they stack against other companies and gives them access to resources. Other member benefits include participation in business transformation projects and access to the Carbon4Good Calculator, which allows companies to view their emissions and shows them how to offset these emissions.

NZI National Sustainable Business Network Awards
Every year the SBN holds the NZI National Sustainable Business Network Awards. They are the longest standing sustainability awards in New Zealand and they showcase businesses, groups and individuals for their sustainable business practices. Members and non-members throughout New Zealand are welcome to enter and in 2013 there were more than 230 entries for the awards. The awards are based on the transformation areas and include:
NZI Greatest Contribution to a Sustainable New Zealand
Renewables - Innovation
Renewables - Impact
Community - Impact
Community Innovation
Mega-efficiency - Innovation
Mega-efficiency - Impact
Restorative - Innovation
Restorative - Impact
Communicating Sustainability
Sustainability Champion
Energy Management

References

Sustainability organizations
Organisations based in Auckland